Supreme Soviet elections were held in the Turkmen SSR on 7 January 1990. Multi-party politics had been introduced but the Communist Party of Turkmenistan (CPT) remained the only registered party. With a voter turnout of  93.6%, the CPT won around 90% of the 175 seats.

References

Elections in Turkmenistan
Supreme
Turkmen
One-party elections